Gregory House, is a historic home located at 140 South Cherry Street in Poughkeepsie, Dutchess County, New York.  It was built about 1869, is a -story, Second Empire-style dwelling.  It features a bellcast mansard roof.

On November 26, 1982, it was added to the National Register of Historic Places.

References

Houses on the National Register of Historic Places in New York (state)
Second Empire architecture in New York (state)
Houses completed in 1869
Houses in Poughkeepsie, New York
National Register of Historic Places in Poughkeepsie, New York